Matngele or Madngele is an extinct Australian Aboriginal language of the Northern Territory spoken by the Madngella and Yunggor peoples.

Classification
Tryon (1974) classified Matngele with Kamu, and this is accepted by Dixon (2002) and Bowern (2011), though denied by Harvey (1990).

Phonology

Vowels

Consonants

Grammar
Matngele has only five simple verbs. These must be combined with coverbs in order to form complex verbs.

References

External links
 Matngele at the Dalylanguages.org website.

Eastern Daly languages